M-1 Challenge is a competitions organized by M-1 Global with a series of events held in different places around the world where MMA fighters compete against each other. The events are broadcast in over 100 countries. Fighters in over 30 countries applied to compete.

Seasons
2008 M-1 Challenge season
2009 M-1 Challenge season
2010 M-1 Challenge season
2011 M-1 Challenge season
2012 M-1 Challenge season

See also
M-1 Global
M-1 Selection

References

External links
  (English)